The 1921 Villanova Wildcats football team represented the Villanova University during the 1921 college football season. The Wildcats team captain was Joseph McCarthy.

Schedule

References

Villanova
Villanova Wildcats football seasons
Villanova Wildcats football